Koritna is a village in Croatia. 

Populated places in Osijek-Baranja County